Middlesex 4 was an English level 13 Rugby Union league with teams from north-west London taking part.  Promoted teams moved up to Middlesex 3 and since the cancellation of Middlesex 5 at the end of the 1991–92 season there was no relegation.  The division was cancelled in at the end of the 1995–96 campaign after nine seasons due to the merger of the Hertfordshire and Middlesex regional leagues.

Original teams
When the division was created in 1988 it contained the following teams:

Actonians - relegated from Middlesex 3 South (6th)
Bank of England - relegated from Middlesex 3 South (5th)
Enfield Ignatians - N/A
Feltham - relegated from Middlesex 3 South (8th)
Hayes - relegated from Middlesex 3 South (10th)
London French - relegated from Middlesex 3 South (7th)
Meadhurst - relegated from Middlesex 3 South (9th)
Roxeth Manor Old Boys - relegated from Middlesex 3 North (6th)
S.T. and C. - relegated from Middlesex 3 North (9th)
UCS Old Boys - relegated from Middlesex 3 North (7th)

Middlesex 4 honours

The original Middlesex 4 was a tier 11 league.  Promotion was up to Middlesex 3 and relegation was down to Middlesex 5.

Middlesex 4 (1988–1992)

Middlesex 4 (1992–1996)

The creation of Herts/Middlesex at the beginning of the 1992–93 season meant that Middlesex 4 dropped to become a tier 12 league.  The introduction of National 5 South for the 1993–94 season meant that Middlesex 4 dropped another level to become a tier 13 league for the years that National 5 South was active.  Promotion continued to Middlesex 3 but the cancellation of Middlesex 5 at the end of the 1991–92 season meant there was no longer relegation.  The merging of the Hertfordshire and Middlesex regional divisions at the end of the 1995–96 season meant that Middlesex 4 was cancelled.

Number of league titles

Actonians (1)
Bank of England (1)
Enfield Ignatians (1)
HAC (1)
London French (1)
London Nigerian (1)
Quintin (1)
Royal Hospitals (1)

Notes

See also
London & SE Division RFU
Middlesex RFU
English rugby union system
Rugby union in England

References

Defunct rugby union leagues in England
Rugby union in Middlesex